Cosmic Express is a puzzle video game created by Alan Hazelden, Benjamin Davis and Tyu. The game was released in 2017 for personal computers and mobile devices.

Gameplay
Cosmic Express is a puzzle video game that tasks players with constructing train tracks inside spacedomes to transports passengers to their destinations.

Development and release
Cosmic Express was created by independent developers Alan Hazelden, Benjamin Davis and Tyu. The game developed using the Unity game engine. The game was released for Linux, macOS, and Windows-based personal computers and Android and iOS mobile devices on 16 March 2017.

See also
 Causality (video game)

References

External links
 

2017 video games
Android (operating system) games
IOS games
Linux games
MacOS games
Puzzle video games
Windows games